ABAP is a programming language by SAP.

ABAP may also refer to:
 Akhil Bharatiya Adhivakta Parishad, association of lawyers in India
 Akhil Bharatiya Akhara Parishad, Hindu organisation in India
 American Beauty/American Psycho (AB/AP), album by Fall Out Boy
 Association of Boxing Alliances in the Philippines